Adolphe Léon Willette (30 July 1857, Châlons-sur-Marne4 February 1926, Paris) was a French painter, illustrator, caricaturist, and lithographer, as well as an architect of the famous Moulin Rouge cabaret. Willette ran as an "anti-semitic" candidate in the 9th arrondissement of Paris for the September 1889 legislative elections.

Biography
Willette studied for four years at the École des Beaux-Arts under Alexandre Cabanel. His graphical work ranged from dainty triviality or political satire: he made Pierrot an imaginary hero of France, and established Mimi Pinson as frail, lovable, and essentially good-hearted. He could also be bitter and fierce, a partisan of political ideas. The guillotine and the figure of Death appear in his caricatures. At the time of the Dreyfus affair he was an anti-dreyfusard; with Jean-Louis Forain, he moved to the political right.

Works
The artist was a prolific contributor to the French illustrated press under the pseudonyms "Cémoi", "Pierrot", "Louison", "Bébé", and "Nox", but more often under his own name. He illustrated Melandri's Les Pierrots and Les Giboulles d'avril, Le Courrier français, and published his own Pauvre Pierrot and other works, in which he tells his stories in scenes in the manner of Busch. He decorated several "brasseries artistiques" with wall-paintings, stained glass, and so on notably Le Chat noir and La Palette d'or, and he painted the ceiling for La Cigale music hall. Willette contributed to the Salon des Cent and six of his posters were published in Les Maîtres de l'Affiche. A collection of his works was exhibited in 1888. His V'almy is in the Luxembourg, Paris.

Willette's characteristically fantastic Parce Domine was commissioned by Rodolphe Salis for Le Chat Noir in Montmartre. It was shown in the Franco-British Exhibition in 1908.

Selected works

References

External links

Selections from l'Assiette au Beurre

1857 births
1926 deaths
People from Châlons-en-Champagne
19th-century French painters
French male painters
20th-century French painters
20th-century French male artists
French caricaturists
French illustrators
Art Nouveau painters
Art Nouveau illustrators
Burials at Montparnasse Cemetery
20th-century French printmakers
Moulin Rouge
19th-century French male artists